"Freak on a Leash" is a song by the American nu metal band Korn, featured on the group's 1998 studio album, Follow the Leader. After Follow the Leaders release, the song was released as a single on February 25, 1999, and since then, it has been re-released over ten times. The song uses dissonance, distortion, various guitar effects, and a heavy, aggressive style.

The "Freak on a Leash" music video was released on February 5, 1999. Directed by Todd McFarlane in Los Angeles, California, the video explores both animations and live performances mixed together. As a result, the band released a music video that won five awards and was retired from Total Request Live. The single peaked at number six on the Alternative Songs chart, 10 on the Mainstream Rock Songs chart, and 24 on the UK Singles Chart.

Origins
Following the release of Follow the Leader, Korn promoted the studio album by headlining the Family Values Tour in 1998. The tour ran from September 22 until October 31. "Freak on a Leash" was the first song played on their first tour date. The original composition had a "noisy guitar break in the middle," but, after the group found out that radio stations are not fond of "noisy guitar breaks," they voted 4–1 to remove the break, with Jonathan Davis being the lone holdout. The band described the break as "the Biohazard part."

"Freak on a Leash" was written in 1997 and recorded in May 1998 at NRG Recording Studios in North Hollywood, California. It was released as their second single, on May 25, 1999, and is considered to be one of their most successful singles. Since its first release in the United Kingdom, it has been released over ten times. It was released in the United Kingdom three times, twice in Mexico and Australia, once in Germany, once in France, once in the United States, and once in Switzerland. Guitarist Brian "Head" Welch said that the song "was about Jonathan Davis being a freak on a leash—sort of a kinky dominatrix thing." Leah Furman said that the song "revolved around the mixed blessings of fame".

Composition
"Freak on a Leash" is four minutes and 15 seconds long. The song uses dissonance, distortion, and various effects to bring the song "to life." David Lloyd from the University of Alberta said that the song was an example of a "nonsense-utterance" technique used by lead vocalist Jonathan Davis. Lloyd also noted that the song contained "fragments of English-language words," and said that they "can be perceived in the midst of Davis' gibberish". Lloyd went on to say that "Davis is giving voice to his inner basic feelings which are trying to resist being shaped or conditioned by utterances of others."

Elias Pampalk said that the song was "rather aggressive" and said it was heavy metal/death metal. Pampalk proclaimed that "melodic elements do not play an important role in 'Freak on a Leash' and the specific loudness sensation is a rather complex pattern". There are reoccurring elements throughout "Freak on a Leash". The song contains vocals, guitars, bass and percussion. It expresses moods such as anger, drama, and sarcasm.

An acoustic rendition of the song was recorded with Jonathan Davis singing a duet with Amy Lee of Evanescence, at MTV studios in Times Square, New York City for Korn's acoustic set on December 9, 2006.

Music video

A music video for "Freak on a Leash" was released on February 5, 1999, and debuted on Total Request Live. It was directed by Todd McFarlane who was assisted by Jonathan Dayton and Valerie Faris. The music video contains a mixture of animation and live performance footage. Although it was expected to be released in January 1999, it was pushed back to February 1999. The video starts with an animated segment directed by McFarlane, where the children (including a cameo appearance of Korn as some of the children) playing hopscotch on a cliff the artist drew for the Follow the Leader cover are interrupted by a policeman. An accidentally-fired bullet from the policeman's gun breaks out of the animated world into the real world and wreaks much property damage while narrowly avoiding hitting people. The bullet then enters a Korn poster exactly at the break in the middle of the song and flies around the band members before Jonathan Davis shouts "go!", signaling the end of the break, to send the bullet back the way it came until it returns to the animated world. Once back in the animated world, the girl in red (also from the album cover) catches the bullet and gives it to the policeman. The policeman stares at his hands bewildered as the camera then focuses on the loose "No Trespassing" sign; which then leads up to the follow-up video for "Falling Away from Me" featured on the band's then next album Issues. The directory work was described as combining "special effects and clever camera moves in the live action portion of the video."

The video won awards for Best Editing and Best Rock Video at the 1999 MTV Video Music Awards, and later received the Grammy Award for Best Short Form Music Video in 2000. It became the ninth video that was retired from Total Request Live on May 11, 1999. The music video was also featured on Deuce.

As of March 9, 2023 the song has over 266 million views on YouTube.

Reception
David Lloyd said it was Korn's most popular song, and on July 8, 1999, the song was the ninth most-infringed song on the Internet. iTunes said that "Wright and Thompson bring a brighter, sharper sheen to Korn's sound, which helped make huge hits out of 'Freak on a Leash'."
Allmusic editor highlighted the song. David Fricke described: "caged-animal babble (the Busta Rhymes-in-Bellevue outburst in "Freak on a Leash")..." Yahoo Music! concluded that Davis delves into his own personal demons, in this song present.

It was rated the sixth-top single of 1999 by Spin. It reached number six on the Billboard Modern Rock Tracks chart and number ten on the Mainstream Rock Tracks chart, and was successful on the Hot 100 charting number 89. It was also immensely popular in Australia where the single was certified Gold for shipments in excess of 35,000 units. The song appeared on VH1's list of the "40 Greatest Metal Songs" at number twenty-three.

The music video debuted at number eight on MTV's Total Request Live on February 9, 1999, and peaking at number 1 on its thirteenth day, February 25. and spent ten non-consecutive days at the top position until its "retirement", on May 11, 1999. It won the Grammy Award for Best Short Form Music Video and the 1999 Metal Edge Readers' Choice Award for "Music Video of the Year". It was also nominated for nine 1999 MTV Video Music Awards, including Best Direction. It won two, Best Rock Video and Best Editing.

The song made VH1's "100 Greatest Songs of the 90s" list at number sixty-nine, and VH1's "100 Greatest Hard Rock Songs" at number forty-eight.  In 2017, Spin ranked it as number one on their list of the 30 greatest nu metal songs of all time. In 2019, Loudwire ranked the song number one on their list of the 50 greatest Korn songs, and in 2021, Kerrang ranked the song number four on their list of the 20 greatest Korn songs.

Freak on a Leash won five awards and was nominated fifteen times. The song won two MTV Music Awards, one Billboard Music Award, one Grammy Award, and one Metals' Edge Readers Choice Award. The song also debuted in 15 countries worldwide, and topped three Modern Rock Radio Station charts, and one Mainstream Rock Radio Station chart in 1999.

Accolades

Billboard Music Awards

!Ref.
|-
| rowspan=2|1999
| rowspan=2|"Freak on a Leash"
| Best Hard Rock Clip
| 
| rowspan=1|
|-
| Best Modern Rock Clip
| 
|

Grammy Awards
The Grammy Awards are awarded annually by the National Academy of Recording Arts and Sciences. Freak on a Leash has received one award from two nominations.

|-
| rowspan="2"|  || rowspan="2"| "Freak on a Leash" || Best Hard Rock Performance || 
|-
| Best Short Form Music Video || 
|-

Metals Edge Readers' Choice Awards

!Ref.
|-
| rowspan=2|1999
| rowspan=2|"Freak on a Leash"
| Music Video of the Year
| 
| rowspan=1|

MTV Video Music Awards

|-
| rowspan="9"|  || rowspan="9"| "Freak on a Leash" || Best Rock Video || 
|-
| Breakthrough Video || 
|-
| Best Direction || 
|-
| Best Special Effects || 
|-
| Best Art Direction || 
|-
| Best Editing || 
|-
| Best Cinematography || 
|-
| Viewer's Choice || 
|-
| Video of the Year || 
|-

MuchMusic Video Awards
The MuchMusic Video Awards is an annual awards ceremony presented by the Canadian music video channel MuchMusic. Freak on a Leash has one nomination.

|-
| 1999 || "Freak on a Leash" || Best International Video || 
|-

Appearances in media
In early February 1999, "Freak on a Leash" was used in a Puma television advertisement that debuted during the Super Bowl pre-game show, featuring Korn's live performance interspersed with Serena Williams and Vince Carter competing in their respective sports.

The song was briefly played in a 2007 episode of The Simpsons titled "Stop! Or My Dog Will Shoot", while the family pet Santa's Little Helper is looking for Homer Simpson in a Korn maze.

In 2008, the song has been featured in the video game Guitar Hero World Tour.

Formats and track listings

European single #1

US single #1

UK single #1

Swedish single #1

Australian single #1

European single #2

Mexican single

US single #2

UK single #2

UK single #3

UK single #4

Australian single #2

Charts

Weekly charts

MTV Unplugged rendition ft. Amy Lee

Year-end charts

Certifications

References

Bibliography
 

Korn songs
1999 singles
Grammy Award for Best Short Form Music Video
Animated music videos
Music videos directed by Jonathan Dayton and Valerie Faris
Immortal Records singles
Epic Records singles
1998 songs
Songs written by Jonathan Davis
Songs written by James Shaffer
Songs written by Reginald Arvizu
Songs written by Brian Welch
Songs written by David Silveria
Songs about BDSM
Amy Lee songs